Dong Honglin (born 15 January 1996) is a Chinese footballer who currently plays for Chinese Super League side Changchun Yatai.

Club career
Dong Honglin started his professional football career in 2016 when he was promoted to China League One side Dalian Yifang's first team squad. On 12 March 2016, he made his senior debut in a league game in a 2–0 home win over Zhejiang Yiteng, coming on for Sun Bo in the 89th minute. Throughout the 2017 league season he would be a peripheral member of the squad as Dalian won the division championship and promotion to the Chinese Super League. He would receive trials with Shenzhen before the 2017 season and with Tianjin TEDA before the 2018 season but eventually stayed at Dalian due to disagreements with the transfer fee. On 24 April 2018, Dong assisted Sun Guowen's opener in a 4–1 away win over Liaoning in the 2018 Chinese FA Cup. On 2 May 2018, he played in another FA Cup match against Chongqing Dangdai Lifan where he was substituted off due to injury.

On 1 February 2019, Dong transferred to fellow Super League side Chongqing Lifan. He would make his debut for the club on 1 May 2019, in a FA Cup match against Hebei China Fortune in a 1-0 victory. This was followed by his league debut on 5 May 2019, against Tianjin Tianhai in a 3-3 draw. On 29 May 2019, he would score his first senior goal against Shanghai Shenhua in a FA Cup match that ended in a 3-2 defeat.

Career statistics
.

Honours

Club
Dalian Yifang
China League One: 2017

References

External links
 

1996 births
Living people
Chinese footballers
Footballers from Dalian
Dalian Professional F.C. players
Chongqing Liangjiang Athletic F.C. players
Chinese Super League players
China League One players
Association football defenders